Mr Gay World South Africa (formerly known as Mr Gay South Africa) is a registered and trademarked competition founded in 2009 to present a professional competition for gay men in South Africa – a role model and a representative of which the entire LGBTI (lesbian, gay, bisexual, transsexual and intersex) community can be proud of. Both the 2009 and 2010 winners, Charl van den Berg and Francois Nel, went on to win the Mr. Gay World title; Charl in Oslo, Norway and Francois in Manila, Philippines. The 2011 Mr Gay South Africa, Lance Weyer, was first runner-up when Mr Gay World was hosted by South Africa in Johannesburg in April 2012. Mr Gay South Africa 2012 was chosen at a glittering Grand Finale in Pretoria on Saturday 8 December 2012 at the brand new, state-of-the-art Atterbury Theatre at Lynnwood Bridge and would have represented South Africa at Mr Gay World 2013, in August 2013 in Antwerp, Belgium. He is 23-year-old Jason Rogers from Pretoria. Rogers has since resigned, citing work and study commitments preventing him from giving his full commitment to the title. The first runner-up, Steve Williams, took over the 2012 title since June 2013 and represented South Africa at Mr Gay World 2013 in Antwerp, Belgium. The 2013 title holder is Werner de Waal, representing South Africa at Mr. Gay World 2014 in Rome, Italy. The competition is defined by the organisation as the search for the ultimate gay male in South Africa. Mr Gay South Africa is a heavily promoted role in the country and the title holder takes his job of educating, informing and campaigning to the public at large seriously. The winner represents South Africa at the annual Mr Gay World competition.

History
Mr Gay South Africa was established in 2009.  Its first and second years' winners, Charl van den Berg (2009) and Francois Nel (2010), both proceeded to win the Mr Gay World competition; Charl in Oslo, Norway in February 2010 and Francois in Manila, Philippines in March 2011. On 26 November 2011, Mr Gay South Africa 2011, Lance Weyer (24) was crowned winning prizes valued at over R300 000. The first runner-up was aleXander Steyn and the second runner-up was Casper Bosman. Lance Weyer is an elected public representative (East London), this fact causing the mainstream press in South Africa to widely report on his win. Mr Gay South Africa won the right to host Mr Gay World 2012, which was held over four days in Johannesburg from 4 to 8 April 2012, with the Grand Finale attended by more than 1000 people on 8 April 2012.

Titleholders

References 

Beauty pageants in South Africa
LGBT culture in South Africa
LGBT beauty pageants
Male beauty pageants
2009 establishments in South Africa
Recurring events established in 2009
Annual events in South Africa
South African awards
Mr Gay World